The Prince of Essling was a title of French nobility which was granted to Marshal André Masséna in 1809.  The title was created as a 'victory title' by Emperor Napoléon I after the Battle of Essling.  The title was finalised by patented letters of 31 January 1810.

As of 2021, the title along with the cadet title, Duke of Rivoli is the only title created by Napoleon still in existence (which is not merged).

List of titleholders 
Holders of the title of Prince of Essling have included:
 1810–1817; André Masséna, 1st Prince of Essling (16 May 1758 – 4 April 1817)
 1818–1821; Jacques Prosper Masséna, 2nd Prince of Essling (25 June 1793 – 1821)
 1821–1863; François Victor Masséna, 3rd Prince of Essling (2 April 1799 – 16 April 1863)
 1863–1898; André Prosper Victor Masséna, 4th Prince of Essling (1829–1898)
 1898–1910; Victor Masséna, 5th Prince of Essling (14 January 1836 – 28 October 1910)
 1910–1974; André Prosper Victor Eugène Napoléon Masséna, 6th Prince of Essling (1891–1974)
 1974–present; Victor-André Masséna, 7th Prince of Essling (29 April 1950 – living)

Coat of arms 
The coat of the arms of the Prince of Essling comprised the following:

Coat of Arms
"Or, with the winged victory of carnation, holding in one hand a palm and in the other an olive crown, the whole Vert, accompanied in a point of a dog lying Sable; to the chief of the Dukes of the Empire".

Princely Arms
"Head of azure with the golden eagle, the flight extended, head rounded, encroaching a thunderbolt with two lightning bolts, on either side. The shield surrounded by the collar of the Legion of Honour, with its pointed decoration; the whole set in a mantle of azure, lined with ermine, adorned with gold and crowned with a princely crown of gold, cap azure, surmounted by a globe, circled, crisscross, gold."

Footnotes

References 

 

Princes of Essling
Lists of French nobility
Lists of princes
Noble titles created in 1810